

Retirement

Front office movements

Head coach changes
Off-season

Player Movement

Trades

References

transactions
transactions, 2014-15